Manfried Sant'Anna (São Gonçalo, April 29, 1936), known artistically as Dedé Santana, is a Brazilian comedian, best known for his role in the television series Os Trapalhões, where he was one of the four protagonists.

Short bio

Dedé was raised among circus performers in a Roma family. He and his brother Dino Santana (deceased in 2010) acted in television as a comedic couple named Maloca e Bonitão in 1965.

Later, Dedé joined the comedian Renato Aragão and created another comedian duo that later with the addition of Mussum and Zacarias, would become the famous Brazilian quartet Os Trapalhões, which with its TV series (aired by Rede Globo) and movies, gained national fame in the 1970s, 1980s and early 1990s. His brother Dino Santana acted in Trapalhões's movies and series as a supporting actor. After Zacarias and Mussum deaths (respectively in 1990 and 1994), the famous group came to an end.

Dedé then had little participations on television, like in the Chico Anysio's Escolinha do Professor Raimundo (Portuguese for Teacher Raimundo's Little School) and acted was a teacher in the TV series Escolinha do Barulho (Portuguese for Noisy little School, aired by Rede Record), in the late 1990s.

He returned to TV, along with his brother, in 2005, in the TV series Dedé e o Comando Maluco (Portuguese for Dedé and the Mad Commando, aired by SBT), in association with manager Beto Carrero. After Carrero's death, in 2008, Dedé returned to Rede Globo and again joined his old friend Renato Aragão in the TV series A Turma do Didi (Portuguese for Didi's Gang, and later named Aventuras do Didi, Portuguese for Didi's Adventures).

Television
 A E I O URCA (TV Tupi, 1964–1965)
 Os Legionários (TV Excelsior, 1965–1966)
 Adoráveis Trapalhões (TV Excelsior, 1965–1966)
 Quartel do Barulho (TV Record, 1966–1969)
 Os Insociáveis (TV Record, 1972–1974)
 Os Trapalhões (TV Tupi, 1974–1976)
 Os Trapalhões (TV Globo, 1977–1996)
 Criança Esperança (TV Globo, 1986–1996, 2004, 2008, 2009 and 2010—)
 Os Trapalhões – Melhores Momentos de Todos os Tempos (reruns, TV Globo, 1994–1999)
 Escolinha do Professor Raimundo (TV Globo, 1995)
 Os Trapalhões em Portugal (TV SIC, Portugal, 1994–1997)
 Escolinha do Barulho (TV Record, 1999–2001)
 Dedé e o Comando Maluco (SBT, 2005–2008)
 A Turma do Didi (TV Globo, 2008, 2009–2010 —).
 Aventuras do Didi (TV Globo, 2010)

Discography
1996 – Trapalhões e Seus Amigos
1995 – Os Trapalhões em Portugal
1991 – Amigos do Peito – 25 Anos de Trapalhões
1988 – Os Trapalhões
1987 – Os Trapalhões
1985 – A Filha dos Trapalhões
1984 – Os Trapalhões
1984 – Os Trapalhões e o Mágico de Oroz
1984 – O Trapalhão na Arca de Noé
1983 – O Cangaceiro Trapalhão
1982 – Os Trapalhões na Serra Pelada
1982 – Os Vagabundos Trapalhões
1981 – Os Saltimbancos Trapalhões
1981 – O Forró dos Trapalhões
1979 – Os Trapalhões na TV
1975 – Os Trapalhões – Volume 2
1974 – Os Trapalhões – Volume 1

Filmography

Solo
 1986 – As Sete Vampiras
 1973 – Sob o Domínio do Sexo
 1972 – Os Desempregados
 1970 – Se Meu Dólar Falasse
 1969 – Deu a Louca no Cangaço
 1969 – 2000 Anos de Confusão
 1967 – A Espiã Que Entrou em Fria
 1964 – Lana, Queen of the Amazons
 1962 – Rio à Noite

with Renato Aragão
1999 – O Trapalhão e a Luz Azul
1998 – Simão, o Fantasma Trapalhão
1997 – O Noviço Rebelde
1971 – Bonga, O Vagabundo
1965 – Na onda do Iê-Iê-Iê

with Mussum and Zacarias
1983 – Atrapalhando a Suate

with Os Trapalhões
1991 – Os Trapalhões E A Árvore da Juventude
1990 – O Mistério de Robin Hood
1990 – Uma Escola Atrapalhada
1989 – Os Trapalhões na Terra dos Monstros
1989 – A Princesa Xuxa e os Trapalhões
1988 – O Casamento dos Trapalhões
1988 – Os Heróis Trapalhões - Uma Aventura na Selva
1987 – Os Trapalhões no Auto da Compadecida
1987 – Os Fantasmas Trapalhões
1986 – Os Trapalhões e o Rei do Futebol
1986 – Os Trapalhões no Rabo do Cometa
1985 – Os Trapalhões no Reino da Fantasia
1984 – A Filha dos Trapalhões
1984 – Os Trapalhões e o Mágico de Oróz
1983 – O Cangaceiro Trapalhão
1982 – Os Vagabundos Trapalhões
1982 – Os Trapalhões na Serra Pelada
1981 – Os Saltimbancos Trapalhões
1980 – O Incrível Monstro Trapalhão
1980 – Os Três Mosqueteiros Trapalhões
1979 – O Rei e os Trapalhões
1979 – O Cinderelo Trapalhão
1978 – Os Trapalhões na Guerra dos Planetas
1977 – O Trapalhão nas Minas do Rei Salomão
1977 – Simbad, O Marujo Trapalhão
1976 – O Trapalhão no Planalto dos Macacos
1975 – O Trapalhão na Ilha do Tesouro
1974 – Robin Hood, O Trapalhão da Floresta
1973 – Aladim e a Lâmpada Maravilhosa
1972 – Ali Babá e os Quarenta Ladrões
1966 – Na Onda do Iê-Iê-Iê
1966 – A Ilha dos Paqueras

Notes

External links

 Página oficial de "A Turma do Didi"

Os Trapalhões
Living people
1936 births
Brazilian male television actors
Brazilian male comedians
People from São Gonçalo, Rio de Janeiro
20th-century Brazilian male actors
21st-century Brazilian male actors